Sean Smith is the director of NCI Australia with a conjoint position of professor of computational nanomaterials science and technology at the Australian National University (ANU).

Education and research
Smith received a BSc and PhD in chemistry at University of Canterbury in Christchurch, New Zealand before postdoctoral work at University of California, Berkeley (1991-1993) and the University of Göttingen (Humboldt Fellow 1989–1991).

In 1993 he started work at the University of Queensland, eventually heading up the Computational Reaction Dynamics Group before moving on to Oak Ridge National Laboratory in 2011 where he was the director of the Center for Nanophase Materials Sciences. After leaving Oak Ridge in 2017 Smith moved to the University of New South Wales where he founded the Integrated Materials Design Centre.

Smith left the University of New South Wales at the end of 2017 to become director of NCI Australia and professor of computational nanomaterials science and technology at Australian National University.

Awards and honours
 Fellow of the Institution of Chemical Engineers (2015)
 Bessel Research Award of the German Alexander von Humboldt Foundation (2006)
 Fellow of the American Association for the Advancement of Science (2012)
 Fellow of the Royal Australian Chemical Institute (1998)
 Le Fevre Memorial Prize of the Australian Academy of Science (1998)
 Rennie Memorial Medal of the Royal Australian Chemical Institute (1994)

Selected publications

References

External links 
 Academic profile at ANU

21st-century Australian scientists
Computational chemists
University of Canterbury alumni